Stanisław Mieczysław Mazur (1 January 1905, Lwów – 5 November 1981, Warsaw) was a Polish mathematician and a member of the Polish Academy of Sciences.

Mazur made important contributions to geometrical methods in linear and nonlinear functional analysis and to the study of Banach algebras. He was also interested in summability theory, infinite games and computable functions.

Lwów and Warsaw

Mazur was a student of Stefan Banach at University of Lwów. His doctorate, under Banach's supervision, was awarded in 1935. Mazur, with Juliusz Schauder, was an Invited Speaker of the ICM in 1936 in Oslo.

Mazur was a close collaborator with Banach at Lwów and was a member of the Lwów School of Mathematics, where he participated in the mathematical activities at the Scottish Café. On 6 November 1936, he posed the "basis problem" of determining whether every Banach space has a Schauder basis, with Mazur promising a "live goose" as a reward: 37 years later and in a ceremony that was broadcast throughout Poland, Mazur awarded a live goose to Per Enflo for constructing a counter-example.

From 1948 Mazur worked at the University of Warsaw.

See also
Approximation problem
Approximation property
Banach–Mazur theorem
Banach–Mazur game
Compact operator
Gelfand–Mazur theorem
Mazur–Ulam theorem
Schauder basis

References

External links 

1905 births
1981 deaths
Lwów School of Mathematics
People from the Kingdom of Galicia and Lodomeria
Ukrainian Jews
Polish Workers' Party politicians
Members of the Central Committee of the Polish United Workers' Party
Members of the Polish Sejm 1947–1952
Members of the Polish Sejm 1952–1956
Functional analysts
Measure theorists
Academic staff of the University of Lviv
Members of the Polish Academy of Sciences
Recipients of the Order of the Banner of Work
Officers of the Order of Polonia Restituta
Academic staff of the University of Warsaw
Recipients of the State Award Badge (Poland)